Frederick Lincoln Siddons (November 21, 1864 – June 19, 1931) was an Associate Justice of the Supreme Court of the District of Columbia.

Education and career

Born on November 21, 1864, in London, England, Siddons received a Bachelor of Laws in 1887 and a Master of Laws in 1888, both from Columbian University School of Law (now George Washington University Law School). He was employed with the United States Department of the Treasury starting in 1888. He entered private practice in Washington, D.C. starting in 1890. He was a Professor of Law at National University School of Law (now George Washington University Law School) from 1898. He was a member of the Commission on Uniform State Laws for the District of Columbia.

Federal judicial service

Siddons was a United States Commissioner for the Supreme Court of the District of Columbia from 1913 to 1915.

Siddons was nominated by President Woodrow Wilson on December 9, 1914, to an Associate Justice seat on the Supreme Court of the District of Columbia (now the United States District Court for the District of Columbia) vacated by Associate Justice Daniel Thew Wright. He was confirmed by the United States Senate on January 15, 1915, and received his commission the same day. His service terminated on June 19, 1931, due to his death in Washington, D.C.

Notable case

In 1927, Justice Siddons was involved in declaring a mistrial at one stage of the Teapot Dome affair, “the largest scandal in the U.S. government since the administration of President Ulysses S. Grant.”

References

Sources
 
 Commercial Law Journal (55 Com. L. J. 290 (1950), http://heinonline.org/HOL/LandingPage?handle=hein.journals/clla55&div=103&id=&page=)
 The Lawyer and Banker and Southern Bench and Southern Bar Review, 468 (1914) (http://heinonline.org/HOL/LandingPage?handle=hein.journals/lbancelj7&div=125&id=&page=)
 The Washington Post, Sunday, July 27, 1913

1864 births
1931 deaths
Judges of the United States District Court for the District of Columbia
United States district court judges appointed by Woodrow Wilson
20th-century American judges
British emigrants to the United States
English emigrants to the United States
Lawyers from Washington, D.C.
George Washington University Law School alumni
George Washington University Law School faculty
United States Department of the Treasury officials